Behind the Headlines is a 1953 British crime film directed by Maclean Rogers and starring Gilbert Harding, John Fitzgerald and Adrienne Fancey.

Cast  
 Gilbert Harding 
 John Fitzgerald  
 Adrienne Fancey  
 Vi Kaley 
 Michael McCarthy  
 Jack May
 Howell Evans 
 Pat Hagen

References

Bibliography
 Chibnall, Steve & McFarlane, Brian. The British 'B' Film. Palgrave MacMillan, 2009.

External links

1953 films
British crime films
1953 crime films
Films directed by Maclean Rogers
British black-and-white films
1950s English-language films
1950s British films